Nicholas Hinds (born October 15, 1997) is an American professional soccer player who plays as a left-back for USL Championship club El Paso Locomotive.

Career

Youth
Hinds began his youth career with Plantation FC and Kendell SC before joining the Seattle Sounders FC Academy in 2015.  On October 22, 2014, Hinds verbally committed to the University of North Carolina.

Club
On August 28, 2015, he made his professional debut for USL club Seattle Sounders FC 2 in a 2–1 defeat to Real Monarchs.

Despite appearing for S2, Hinds was still able to maintain his college eligibility and on February 3, 2016, it was announced that he signed a letter of intent to play college soccer at the University of Akron.

Nashville SC
On February 22, 2021, Hinds signed with Major League Soccer club Nashville SC, after the team acquired his homegrown player rights from the Seattle Sounders FC.

On May 6, 2021, Hinds was loaned to USL Championship side Austin Bold, alongside Nashville SC teammate Elliot Panicco.

Following the 2021 season Hinds' contract option was declined by Nashville and he became a free agent.

On January 18, 2022, Hinds signed with USL Championship side El Paso Locomotive.

International
Born in Jamaica, but raised in Florida, Hinds is eligible to play internationally for Jamaica or United States at the senior international level.

References

External links
Akron Zips bio
USSF Development Academy bio
U.S. Soccer bio

1997 births
Living people
American soccer players
Akron Zips men's soccer players
Association football defenders
People from Plantation, Florida
Soccer players from Florida
Tacoma Defiance players
Nashville SC players
Austin Bold FC players
El Paso Locomotive FC players
USL Championship players
United States men's under-20 international soccer players
Sportspeople from Broward County, Florida
Homegrown Players (MLS)